UAD may stand for:
 United Action for Democracy, a Nigerian political group
 University of Abertay Dundee, a university in Dundee, Scotland
 Universitas Ahmad Dahlan, a university in Yogyakarta, Indonesia
 Democratic Arucasian Union (Spanish: Unión Aruquense Democrática), a small political party in Spain
 Art and Design University of Cluj-Napoca (Romanian: Universitatea de Artă şi Design), an art university in Romania
 UAD-1/UAD-2(Universal Audio Digital)_, a series of Digital signal processor cards
 Uniform Appraisal Dataset, a specification for appraisal data on loans
 Autonomous University of Durango (Spanish: Universidad Autónoma de Durango), a private university in Mexico with multiple campuses